André Guy (born 3 March 1941, in Bourg-en-Bresse) is a French former professional football (soccer) player.

External links
Profile
Profile

Sportspeople from Bourg-en-Bresse
1941 births
Living people
French footballers
France international footballers
FC Sochaux-Montbéliard players
AS Saint-Étienne players
Lille OSC players
Olympique Lyonnais players
Stade Rennais F.C. players
SC Toulon players
Ligue 1 players
Association football forwards
Footballers from Auvergne-Rhône-Alpes